On 23 March 2022 in Somalia, a series of coordinated attacks by al-Shabaab jihadists in the two cities of  Mogadishu and Beledweyne killed over 60 people.

Background
Al-Shabaab are a Somali Islamist group whose insurgency began during the late 2000s. Their attacks have included many in the country's capital Mogadishu, including the deadliest bombing in African history, in October 2017. They have also often attacked Beledweyne, including suicide attacks in June 2009, October and November 2013 and February 2022.

On the week of the attack, elections in Somalia were scheduled to be held for the Federal Parliament of Somalia, ahead of the 2022 Somali presidential election. This bombing targeted candidates and polling places.

Attacks

Aden Adde International Airport shooting
On 23 March, gunmen attacked the eastern area of the Aden Adde International Airport, killing five people, including an AMISOM soldier. Two attackers also were killed. Black smoke was seen rising out of the ground near the runway.

Beledweyne bombings
The next attack occurred a few hours later, as Somali female Member of Parliament Amina Mohamed Abdi left a polling place in Beledweyne. A suicide bomber ran up to Abdi and kissed her before detonating his explosive vest, killing several people. Abdi died instantly along with several bodyguards.

The injured were rushed to the Beledweyne Hospital, where terrorists set off a car bomb, killing at least 30 people. The blast's impact was powerful, with the explosions destroying not only the hospital, but also nearby buildings and cars.

Authorities estimated that at least 48 people were killed by the bombings and 108 others injured.

Beledweyne restaurant attack
Al-Shabaab militants attacked a restaurant in Beledweyne, killing the retired politician Hassan Dhuhul and many others.

Aftermath
Al-Shabaab claimed responsibility for the attacks. Somali Prime Minister Mohamed Hussein Roble and Somali President Mohamed Abdullahi Mohamed both condemned the attacks. Ali Abdullahi Hussein said that the attacks were the worst such incidents in Beledweyne's history. The Lusa News Agency reported that former Education Minister Abdirahman Dahir Osman was among the injured in the attacks, but did not specify which one he was injured in.

The Jordanian Ministry of Foreign Affairs and Expatriates condemned the airport attack on 24 March, expressing condolences to the families of the victims. The Turkish Ministry of Foreign Affairs also denounced the attacks.

See also 
 Mogadishu bombing

References

2022 murders in Somalia
2020s building bombings
2020s crimes in Mogadishu
21st-century mass murder in Somalia
Al-Shabaab (militant group) attacks
Al-Shabaab (militant group) attacks in Mogadishu
Attacks on buildings and structures in 2022
Attacks on government buildings and structures
Attacks on hospitals
Attacks on restaurants in Africa
Beledweyne
Building bombings in Somalia
Car and truck bombings in the 2020s
Islamic terrorist incidents in 2022
March 2022 crimes in Africa
Mass murder in 2022
Mass murder in Mogadishu
Suicide bombings in 2022
March 2022 attacks
Terrorist attacks on airports
March attacks